A list of films produced by the Marathi language film industry based in Maharashtra in the year 1988.

1988 Releases
A list of Marathi films released in 1988.

References

Lists of 1988 films by country or language
 Marathi
1988